X was a steel single hull submarine built for the French Navy between 1904 and 1905. She was launched in November 1904 and commissioned in 1905.

Design
X was an experimental submarine designed by Gaston Romazzotti based on the previous . Steel was used to construct the single hull and she was the first submarine to have twin shafts. Her complement was 15 men.

Her armament comprised one  bow torpedo tube, two  Drzewiecki drop collar torpedo launchers and a  external cradle for one torpedo. In total six torpedoes were carried.

Construction and career

X was laid down in the Arsenal de Cherbourg, launched on 15 November 1904 and completed in 1905. The submarine received the pennant number Q 35 at her commissioning and cost just under half a million Francs.

On 13 February 1911, X was renamed Dauphin.  Dauphin served in the English Channel until 21 May 1914, when she was struck from the Navy List.

See also 

List of submarines of France

References

Bibliography 

 

1904 ships
Experimental submarines
Submarines of the French Navy